Encanto Village is one of the 15 Urban villages that make up the City of Phoenix, in Arizona. The village includes the city's midtown and uptown districts, as well as the popular Encanto neighborhood, its namesake. In 2010, Encanto had a population of 54,614 residents.

Geography
The community is located in Central Phoenix. At about 8 square miles, it is the city's smallest urban village by area, and, consequently, one of its densest.

The western border of the village is the I-17 Black Canyon Freeway, and the southern border is McDowell Road. The Grand Canal makes up the northern and eastern border.

Features
The core of the Encanto Village is the Park Central Mall; and the Arizona State Fair, on whose fairgrounds the Arizona Veterans Memorial Coliseum is located. It was the original home of the Phoenix Suns, the city's NBA franchise. Other points of interest include Encanto Park, Steele Indian School Park, Heard Museum, Phoenix Art Museum and Phoenix College.

The village includes the city's Midtown and Uptown districts, which, combined with nearby Downtown, make up the largest center of employment in the state of Arizona.  Encanto also includes the southern portion of the Melrose District (with the northern portion in neighboring Alhambra), which has an increasing number of gay and lesbian bars.

Transportation
Encanto Village is served by Valley Metro Rail, with 4 stops located within the boundaries of the village,
Thomas/Central Avenue station,
Osborn/Central Avenue station,
Indian School/Central Avenue station, and
Campbell/Central Avenue station

Historic Neighborhoods 
Encanto village contains a majority of the city of Phoenix residential historic districts with 21 of the 36 districts falling within its boundaries.
 Ashland Place
 Alvarado
 Campus Vista
 Cheery Lynn
 Coronado
 Country Club Park
 Del Norte Place
 East Alvarado
 Earll Place
 Encanto-Palmcroft
 Encanto Manor
 Fairview Place
 Idylwilde Park
 La Hacienda
 Los Olivos
 Margarita Place
 North Encanto
 Willo
 Woodlea
 Villa Verde
 Yaple Park

References

External links

Urban villages of Phoenix, Arizona
Gay villages in the United States